Princess Frederica Charlotte of Prussia (Friederike Charlotte Ulrike Katharina; 7 May 1767 – 6 August 1820) was a Prussian princess by birth and a British princess by marriage. She was the eldest daughter of King Frederick William II of Prussia and the wife of Prince Frederick, Duke of York and Albany, second son of King George III of the United Kingdom.

Early life
Born in Charlottenburg on 7 May 1767, Frederica Charlotte was the eldest child of the future Frederick William II of Prussia, and the only child of his first wife and cousin, Elisabeth Christine of Brunswick-Lüneburg.

At the time of her birth, her childless granduncle Frederick the Great was on the throne of Prussia.  Her father was the King's nephew and heir presumptive, while her mother was also the king's niece. Their union was extremely unhappy due to their mutual infidelities. After several affairs with musicians and officers, Frederica's mother became pregnant in 1769. She then plotted to escape from Prussia with her lover, but she was betrayed and captured, causing a public scandal. A divorce was quickly granted, and Elisabeth Christine was placed under house arrest in the castle of Stettin, where she remained for the next seventy-one years, until her death in 1840.

Frederica Charlotte was two years old at the time of her mother's disgrace, and never saw her mother again. Frederick the Great reportedly felt compassion for her mother, and entrusted Frederica Charlotte to the care of his own wife, Elisabeth Christine of Brunswick-Wolfenbüttel-Bevern, with the words: "There is only this poor child remaining to her, and she can find no asylum save with you; let the little one have the apartments lately occupied by my niece of Holland." Frederica Charlotte reportedly had a happy childhood with Queen Elisabeth Christine, who had no children of her own. The Queen doted upon her grandniece and foster daughter, who kept in correspondence with her foster mother her entire life.

Marriage
On 29 September 1791 at Charlottenburg Palace, she married Prince Frederick, Duke of York and Albany, the second son of the British king George III. There was a second marriage ceremony at Buckingham House on 23 November. The new Duchess of York received an enthusiastic welcome in London.

The marriage between Frederica Charlotte and Prince Frederick, Duke of York and Albany was arranged in order to provide the British throne with heirs, as the Prince of Wales was at the time secretly married and his marriage status complicated. Reportedly, the Prince of Wales, who was at the time, albeit not legally, married to Maria Fitzherbert, regarded it unnecessary for him to enter a dynastic marriage, because the eldest of his brothers had married a princess and could provide an heir to the throne in his stead. Frederica Charlotte had been chosen upon the wish of Frederick the Great, who allowed George III to read a letter from Frederica Charlotte displaying her gentle and affectionate nature, successfully anticipating that this would touch George III and make him inquire for her to marry his son.

Upon her marriage, her future mother-in-law Queen Charlotte wrote to Princess Elisabeth Christine: "If anything could add to my satisfaction at the choice of my son, it would be the lively interest which your Majesty takes in the fate of this Princess, your pupil, and I assure you that a Princess brought up under your eye, and to whom you render so high a testimony, shall find in me not only a mother but a friend; and I hope that in gaining the Princess's friendship, I shall also gain a part in yours, which would be of great value to me." The queen kept her word, as Frederica Charlotte wrote home to her foster mother how well treated she was by her mother-in-law, and how welcome she felt in England, where she once stayed for hours in the House of Commons, so interested in the political speeches that the hours felt like minutes.

The marriage was, however, not a happy one, and after three years, it had become apparent that the Duke and Duchess of York would have no issue. Along with the fact that the parliament would make it possible to pay his debts should he marry officially, it was also the fact that the Duchess of York was by 1794 no longer expected to have children which prompted the Prince of Wales to agree to issue marriage negotiations of his own. Frederica Charlotte and Frederick separated and the Duchess retired to Oatlands Park, Weybridge, where she lived eccentrically until her death. Their relationship after separation appears to have been amicable, but there was never any question of reconciliation.

She is described as: "clever and well-informed; she likes society and dislikes all form and ceremony, but in the midst of the most familiar intercourse she always preserves a certain dignity of manner", and :"probably no person in such a situation was ever more really liked." In 1827 (after her death), she was called: "a harmless but an eccentric little woman, with an extraordinary fondness for cats and dogs, some indications of the German severity of family etiquette, which gave her household the air of Potsdam, and but a slight share of those attractions which might retain the regards of a husband—young, a soldier, and a prince." High-stakes gambling is reported to have taken place at Oatlands. Frederica kept many dogs and was apparently very devoted to monkeys Her father-in-law once remarked : "Affection must rest on something, and where there are no children, animals are the object." At her death, her spouse is described as sincerely grieved and very anxious that the wishes expressed in her will should be carried out.

Death

She died, on 6 August 1820, in Oatlands Park, Weybridge, Surrey, England and is commemorated by a monument, erected by the people of Weybridge, that stands on Monument Green, Weybridge.

Ancestry

Notes

House of Hohenzollern
House of Hanover
People from Berlin
Wives of British princes
Wives of knights
Duchesses of York
1767 births
1820 deaths
Prussian princesses
Hanoverian princesses by marriage
Daughters of kings